Men at Work is an Australian pop rock band founded in 1978 in St Kilda, Victoria. The group is best known for several Number 1 singles and studio albums released between 1981 and 1983. The following is a complete chronology of the band's member history. Although active to this day, Colin Hay has been the only constant member throughout the decades (and also the frontman).

Members
Present

Former

Timeline

Line-ups

References

Lists of members by band